On Fire is the second studio album by American indie rock band Galaxie 500, released in 1989 on Rough Trade Records.

In 2010, the album was re-issued and peaked at number 45 on the UK Independent Albums Chart and number 10 on the UK Independent Album Breakers Chart.

Critical reception

Pete Clark of British monthly magazine Hi-Fi News & Record Review left few warm words on album. He said "Galaxie 500 slide through the speakers, encircling the unwary listener with snaking lines of guitar, restrained percussion and a confessional-style vocal."

The Rolling Stone Album Guide called it Galaxie 500's "best album by far". In 2002, Pitchfork placed it at number 16 on its "Top 100 Albums of the 1980s" list. In 2013, Fact placed it at number 51 on its "100 Best Albums of the 1980s" list. In 2018, Pitchfork ranked it fourth on its "The 30 Best Dream Pop Albums" list.

Track listing

Personnel
Credits adapted from liner notes.

Galaxie 500
 Damon Krukowski – drums
 Dean Wareham – guitar, vocals
 Naomi Yang – bass guitar, vocals on "Another Day"

Additional personnel
 Mark Kramer – production, engineering, "cheap organ" on "Isn't It a Pity"
 Ralph Carney – tenor saxophone on "Decomposing Trees"

Charts

Release history

References

External links
 
 

1989 albums
Albums produced by Kramer (musician)
Galaxie 500 albums
Rough Trade Records albums
Rykodisc albums
Domino Recording Company albums